Alphonse François (25 August 1814, Paris - 7 July 1888, Paris) was a French engraver.

Biography
Alphonse François and his elder brother Charles-Rémy-Jules François (died 1861) learned engraving at the school of Louis-Pierre Henriquel-Dupont. He did a large number of engravings, from works by contemporary French painters and by old Italian masters.

François was made an officer of the Légion d'honneur in 1857 and a member of the Institut de France in 1873.

Works
 Bonaparte franchissant les Alpes (“Bonaparte crossing the Alps”),
 Marie-Antoinette au Tribunal révolutionnaire (“Marie Antoinette before the revolutionary tribunal”) and
 Le jeune Pic de la Mirandole apprenant à lire avec sa mère (“The young Giovanni Pico della Mirandola learning from his mother how to read”), after Paul Delaroche;
 La vision d'Ézéchiel (“The vision of Ezekiel”), after Raphael;
 La tentation du Christ (“The temptation of Christ”),
 Mignon et son père (“Mignon and her father”) and
 Mignon dans l'église (“Mignon in the church”), after Ary Scheffer;
 L'épouse du roi Candaule (“The wife of the king Candaules”), after Jean-Léon Gérôme;
 Le couronnement de la Vierge Marie (“The crowning of the Virgin Mary,” from the chapel of San Jacopo Maggiore in Fiesole), an engraving which won him a medal in 1867.

References 

Meyers Konversations-Lexikon.

French engravers
1814 births
1888 deaths
19th-century engravers
Officiers of the Légion d'honneur
Members of the Académie des beaux-arts